The 2020 FIA WTCR Race of Belgium was the first round of the 2020 World Touring Car Cup and the first running of the FIA WTCR Race of Belgium. It was held on 12 and 13 September 2020 at Circuit Zolder in Heusden-Zolder, Belgium.

Entry list

A total of 22 cars are entered, which includes two wildcard entries; Dylan O'Keeffe and Luca Filippi. The following teams and drivers are entered into the event:

Results

Qualifying

For race 1, the top 10 in Q2 were reversed and Q3 results determined race 2 pole position.

  Nick Catsburg was given a five-place grid penalty for failing to slow for yellow flags.
  Luca Filippi and Gábor Kismarty-Lechner's times were deleted as they failed to stop at the weighbridge.

Race 1

Race 2

References

External links
 

World Touring Car Cup
Touring car races